Gruffudd ap Cynan ( 1137), sometimes written as Gruffydd ap Cynan, was King of Gwynedd from 1081 until his death in 1137. In the course of a long and eventful life, he became a key figure in Welsh resistance to Norman rule, and was remembered as King of all the Welsh and Prince of all the Welsh. 

As a descendant of Rhodri Mawr, Gruffudd ap Cynan was a senior member of the princely House of Aberffraw. Through his mother, Gruffudd had close family connections with the Norse settlement around Dublin and he frequently used Ireland as a refuge and as a source of troops. He three times gained the throne of Gwynedd and then lost it again, before regaining it once more in 1099 and this time keeping power until his death. Gruffudd laid the foundations which were built upon by his son Owain Gwynedd and his great-grandson Llywelyn the Great.

Life
Unusual for a Welsh king or prince, a near-contemporary biography of Gruffudd, The history of Gruffudd ap Cynan, has survived. Much of our knowledge of Gruffudd comes from this source. The traditional view among scholars was that it was written during the third quarter of the 12th century during the reign of Gruffudd's son, Owain Gwynedd, but it has recently been suggested that it may date from the early reign of Llywelyn the Great, around 1200. The author is not known.

Most of the existing manuscripts of the history are in Welsh but these are clearly translations of a Latin original. It is usually considered that the original Latin version has been lost, and that existing Latin versions are re-translations from the Welsh. However, Russell (2006) has suggested that the Latin version in Peniarth MS 434E incorporates the original Latin version, later amended to bring it into line with the Welsh text.

Ancestry
According to the Life of Gruffudd ap Cynan, Gruffudd was born in the Hiberno-Norse Kingdom of Dublin and reared near Swords, County Dublin in Ireland. He was the son of an exiled Welsh King as per the Life, Cynan ap Iago, who was a claimant to the kingship of Gwynedd but was probably never its king in actuality, though his father, Gruffudd's grandfather, Iago ab Idwal ap Meurig, had ruled Gwynedd from 1023 to 1039. When Gruffudd first appeared on the scene in Wales the Welsh annals several times refer to him as "grandson of Iago" rather than the more usual "son of Cynan", indicating that his father was little known in Wales. Cynan ap Iago seems to have died while Gruffudd was still young, since the History describes his mother telling him who his father was.

According to Historia Gruffud vab Kenan, Gruffudd's mother was Ragnailt ingen Amlaíb, a granddaughter of King Sigtrygg Silkbeard and a member of the Hiberno-Norse Uí Ímair dynasty. The latter had two sons named Amlaíb: one died in 1013, whilst another died in 1034. Either man could have been Ragnailt's father.

During his many struggles to gain the kingship of Gwynedd, Gruffudd received considerable aid from Ireland, from the Hiberno-Norse at Dublin, the Isles and Wexford and from Muircheartach Ua Briain, because he was also descendant through his mother from Brian Boru, High King of Ireland.

First bid for the throne
Gruffudd first attempted to take over the rule of Gwynedd in 1075, following the death of Bleddyn ap Cynfyn. Trahaearn ap Caradog had seized control of Gwynedd but had not yet firmly established himself. Gruffudd landed on Abermenai Point, Anglesey with an Irish force, and with the assistance of troops provided by the Norman Robert of Rhuddlan first defeated and killed Cynwrig ap Rhiwallon, an ally of Trahaearn who held Llŷn, then defeated Trahaearn himself in the battle of Gwaed Erw in Meirionnydd and gained control of Gwynedd. Gruffudd then led his forces eastwards to reclaim territories taken over by the Normans, and despite the assistance previously given by Robert of Rhuddlan attacked and destroyed Rhuddlan Castle. However tension between Gruffudd's Danish-Irish bodyguard and the local Welsh led to a rebellion in Llŷn, and Trahaearn took the opportunity to counterattack, defeating Gruffudd at the battle of Bron yr Erw above Clynnog Fawr the same year.

Second bid for the throne and capture by the Normans

Gruffudd fled to Ireland but, in 1081, returned and made an alliance with Rhys ap Tewdwr, prince of Deheubarth. Rhys had been attacked by Caradog ap Gruffudd of Gwent and Morgannwg, and had been forced to flee to St David's Cathedral. Gruffudd this time embarked from Waterford with a force composed of Danes and Irish and landed near St David's, presumably by prior arrangement with Rhys. He was joined here by a force of his supporters from Gwynedd, and he and Rhys marched north to seek Trahaearn ap Caradog and Caradog ap Gruffudd who had themselves made an alliance and been joined by Meilyr ap Rhiwallon of Powys. The armies of the two confederacies met at the Battle of Mynydd Carn, with Gruffudd and Rhys victorious and Trahaearn, Caradog and Meilyr all being killed. Gruffudd was thus able to seize power in Gwynedd for the second time.

He was soon faced with a new enemy, as the Normans were now encroaching on Gwynedd. Gruffudd had not been king very long when he was enticed to a meeting with Hugh, Earl of Chester and Hugh, Earl of Shrewsbury at Rhug, near Corwen. At the meeting, Gruffudd was seized and taken prisoner. According to his biographer, this was by the treachery of one of his own men, Meirion Goch. Gruffudd was imprisoned in Earl Hugh's castle at Chester for many years while Earl Hugh and Robert of Rhuddlan went on to take possession of Gwynedd, building castles at Bangor, Caernarfon and Aberlleiniog.

Escape from captivity and third reign
Gruffudd reappeared on the scene years later, having escaped from captivity, he was free by 1094.  Gruffudd again took refuge in Ireland but returned to Gwynedd to lead the assaults on Norman castles such as Castell Aberlleiniog. The Welsh revolt had begun in 1094 and by late 1095 had spread to many parts of Wales. This induced William II of England (William Rufus) to intervene, invading northern Wales in 1095. However, his army was unable to bring the Welsh to battle and returned to Chester without having achieved very much. King William mounted a second invasion in 1097, but again without much success. The History only mentions one invasion by Rufus, which could indicate that Gruffudd did not feature in the resistance to the first invasion. At this time Cadwgan ap Bleddyn of Powys led the Welsh resistance.

In the summer of 1098, Earl Hugh of Chester joined with Earl Hugh of Shrewsbury in another attempt to recover his losses in Gwynedd. Gruffudd and his ally Cadwgan ap Bleddyn retreated to Anglesey, but were then forced to flee to Ireland in a skiff when a fleet he had hired from the Danish settlement in Ireland accepted a better offer from the Normans and changed sides.

King for the fourth time and consolidation
The Normans were obliged to evacuate Anglesey, and the following year, Gruffudd returned from Ireland to take possession again, having apparently come to an agreement with Earl Hugh of Chester. The situation was changed by the arrival of a Norwegian fleet under the command of King Magnus III of Norway, also known as Magnus Barefoot, who attacked the Norman forces near the eastern end of the Menai Straits. Earl Hugh of Shrewsbury was killed by an arrow said to have been shot by Magnus himself.

With the death of Hugh of Chester in 1101, Gruffudd was able to consolidate his position in Gwynedd, as much by diplomacy as by force. He met King Henry I of England who granted him the rule of Llŷn, Eifionydd, Ardudwy and Arllechwedd, considerably extending his kingdom. By 1114, he had gained enough power to induce King Henry to invade Gwynedd, one detachment led by King Alexander I of Scotland. Faced with overwhelming force, Gruffudd was obliged to pay homage to Henry and to pay a heavy fine, but lost no territory.

The Kingdom was expanded by his sons, Owain Gwynedd and later Cadwaladr, by Gruffudd's last years "Ceredigion, Meirionnydd, Rhos, Rhufoniog and Dyffryn Clwyd were under the rule of Gwynedd". The cantrefs of Rhos and Rhufoniog were annexed in 1118, Meirionnydd captured from Powys in 1123, and Dyffryn Clwyd in 1124. Another invasion by the king of England in 1121 was a military failure. The king had to come to terms with Gruffudd and made no further attempt to invade Gwynedd during Gruffudd's reign. The death of Cadwallon in a battle against the forces of Powys near Llangollen in 1132 checked further expansion for the time being.

Gruffudd was now powerful enough to ensure that his nominee David the Scot was consecrated as Bishop of Bangor in 1120. The see had been effectively vacant since bishop Hervey le Breton had been forced to flee by the Welsh almost twenty years before, since Gruffudd and King Henry could not agree on a candidate. David went on to rebuild Bangor Cathedral with a large financial contribution from Gruffudd.

Owain and Cadwaladr, in alliance with Gruffudd ap Rhys of Deheubarth, gained a crushing victory over the Normans at Crug Mawr, near Cardigan, in 1136 and took possession of Ceredigion. The latter part of Gruffydd's reign was considered to be a "Golden Age"; according to the Life of Gruffudd ap Cynan Gwynedd was "bespangled with lime-washed churches like the stars in the firmament".

Death and succession

Gruffudd died in his bed, old and blind in 1137, and was mourned by the annalist of Brut y Tywysogion as the "head and king and defender and pacifier of all Wales". He was buried by the high altar in Bangor Cathedral, which he had been involved in rebuilding. He also made bequests to many other churches, including one to Christ Church Cathedral, Dublin where he had worshipped as a boy. An elegy was sung for him by the poet Meilyr Brydydd, his wife Angharad survived him by 25 years. He was succeeded as king of Gwynedd by his son Owain Gwynedd. His daughter Gwenllian, who married Gruffudd ap Rhys of Deheubarth, son of his old ally Rhys ap Tewdwr, is also notable for her resistance to English rule.

Legacy

According to Hywel Teifi Edwards, Gruffudd, according to legend, not only reformed the Welsh bardic tradition to accord with that of the Irish-language bards, but also sponsored an Eisteddfod at Caerwys during his reign as King of Gwynedd.

Children
The family line of Gruffudd shows he had many children by several different women. With wife Angharad (daughter of Owain ab Edwin) he had:
Cadwallon ap Gruffudd
Owain Gwynedd (Owain ap Gruffudd), married (1) Gwladus (Gladys) ferch Llywarch, daughter of Llywarch ap Trahaearn (2) Cristin ferch Goronwy, daughter of Goronwy ab Owain
Cadwaladr ap Gruffudd, married Alice de Clare, daughter of Richard Fitz Gilbert de Clare
Mareda/Marared
Susanna, married Madog ap Maredudd, prince of Powys
Ranulht/Rannillt, married Madog ap Idnerth, King of Cynllibiwg
Agnes/Annest ferch gruffydd
Gwenllian ferch Gruffudd, married Gruffydd ap Rhys, prince of Deheubarth.

The FitzRery family of Swords, County Dublin, who were prominent in Dublin politics and commercial life until the seventeenth century, claimed descent from Gruffudd: since he was born in Swords, and maintained close links with Ireland, the claim is not implausible.

Ancestry

References

Citations

Book Sources 

 – maryjones.us Edition

Notes

External links

1050s births
1137 deaths
Year of birth uncertain
Monarchs of Gwynedd
Gruffudd
Gruffydd
British people of Scandinavian descent
11th-century Welsh monarchs
12th-century Welsh monarchs
Nobility from Dublin (city)
Norse-Gaelic monarchs
Welsh people of Irish descent